Events in the year 2022 in Sudan.

Incumbents 
 Chairman of the Sovereignty Council: Abdel Fattah al-Burhan
 Prime Minister: Abdalla Hamdok, Osman Hussein

Events 
 August – 2022 Sudan floods
 16 August – A Sudanese official reports that 66 people have been killed and 24,000 homes and buildings have been damaged since flooding began in June.
 15 October – Five people are killed, and nine others are injured in tribal clashes in West Kordofan.
 21 October – Over 150 people are killed in ethnic clashes in Sudan.
 23 October – The death toll from the clashes over a land dispute between the Hausa and the Berta ethnic groups in Blue Nile, Sudan, increases to 220. It is one of the deadliest incident of ethnic violence in the country during the last years.
 27 December –  Sixteen people are killed when a bus collides with a dump truck on the outskirts of Omdurman, Khartoum.

Sports 

 Sudan at the 2021 Islamic Solidarity Games
 Sudan at the 2022 World Aquatics Championships
 Sudan at the 2022 World Athletics Championships

References

External links 
 

2022 in Sudan
Sudan
Sudan
2020s in Sudan
Years of the 21st century in Sudan